Samuel Cowart III (born February 26, 1975) is a former American college and professional football player who was a linebacker in the National Football League (NFL) for eight seasons.  He played college football for Florida State University and was recognized as an All-American.  A second-round pick in the 1998 NFL Draft, he played professionally for the Buffalo Bills, New York Jets, and Minnesota Vikings of the NFL.  Cowart was a Pro Bowl selection in 2000.

Early years
Cowart was born in Jacksonville, Florida.  He attended Mandarin High School in Jacksonville, and played for the Mandarin Mustangs high school football team.  As a senior football player, he was a Super Prep high school All-American selection and a USA Today All-America honorable mention, named the Jacksonville Defensive Player of the Year, and won first-team all-state honors, and helped lead the Mustangs to the district championship in the state playoffs.

College career
Cowart attended Florida State University, where he played for coach Bobby Bowden's Florida State Seminoles football team from 1993 through 1997.  He was a reserve linebacker on the Seminoles' 1993 national championship team.  In 1995, he led FSU in tackles in with 115 (76 solo), finishing sixth in the Atlantic Coast Conference (ACC) in that category.  The same year, Cowart had three quarterback sacks and 13 tackles in the FSU-Florida game (at Florida) to earn ABC player of the game honors.  Returning in 1997 after a knee injury that kept him out of the 1996 season, Cowart earned consensus first-team All-American recognition, leading the team with 116 tackles.  He also set an FSU team record with three fumbles returned or recovered for touchdowns.  He was a finalist for the Butkus Award and Bronko Nagurski Trophy and winner of the ACC's Brian Piccolo Award for the conference's "Most Courageous Player."

Professional career

Buffalo Bills
Cowart was drafted by the Buffalo Bills in the second round of the 1998 NFL Draft. He played for the Bills for four seasons and received a trip to the Pro Bowl in the 2000 season.

Before he was cut down by injuries, Cowart, was a sideline-to-sideline force on a playmaking par with Baltimore Ravens linebacker Ray Lewis. Cowart was the Pro Bowl heart of Buffalo's defense until he was chopped down by Frank Middleton, a Tampa Bay Buccaneers guard, resulting in a severe ankle injury that ended his 2000 season after 12 games. Cowart also suffered a season-ending Achilles' tendon tear in Buffalo's 2001 season opener.

"He and Ray Lewis were the best linebackers in the league before Sam suffered that Achilles' injury," said Ted Cottrell, Cowart’s defensive coordinator for the Bills from 1998 to 2000.

New York Jets
After the 2001 year, Cowart went to the New York Jets. He played as a starting linebacker for them in one of thirty-one games of the first two seasons. His third season he played nine games and only started two.

Minnesota Vikings
Cowart was indirectly involved in the Minnesota/Oakland trade that sent Randy Moss to the Oakland Raiders in exchange for linebacker Napoleon Harris, a 1st round pick (7th overall) and a 7th round pick.  Cowart was then traded by the New York Jets, to the Minnesota Vikings in exchange for the 7th round pick that was received from Oakland. He only played one season for the Vikings starting fourteen of fifteen games he played in.

Houston Texans
After the 2005 season the Vikings released Cowart. Cowart signed with the Houston Texans to become their starting middle linebacker until he was injured and was to miss the whole season. While injured, rookie DeMeco Ryans took over the middle linebacker duties and was so impressive that he was named NFL Defensive Rookie of the Year. After the Texans made Ryans their full-time starter they felt that they did not need Cowart any more so he was released after the 2006 season.

NFL statistics

Regular season

Postseason

Post NFL career
Cowart now lives in the Jacksonville, FL area and works at the financial firm Northwestern Mutual.

References

1975 births
Living people
All-American college football players
American Conference Pro Bowl players
American football linebackers
Buffalo Bills players
Florida State Seminoles football players
Minnesota Vikings players
New York Jets players
Players of American football from Jacksonville, Florida
Mandarin High School alumni